The 1896 Indiana gubernatorial election was held on November 3, 1896. Republican nominee James A. Mount defeated Democratic nominee Benjamin F. Shively with 50.93% of the vote.

General election

Candidates
Major party candidates
James A. Mount, Republican, former state senator
Benjamin F. Shively, Democratic, former U.S. Representative from Indiana's 13th congressional district

Other candidates
Thomas Wadsworth, People's
Leander M. Crist, Prohibition
James G. Kingsbury, National
Philip H. Moore, Socialist Labor

Results

References

1896
Indiana
Gubernatorial